Hey You, I Love Your Soul is the second studio album by American Christian rock band Skillet. It was released in 1998 as an enhanced CD from ForeFront Records and Ardent Records.

Track listing

Personnel 
Skillet
 John L. Cooper – vocals, acoustic piano, keyboards, bass guitar, drum programming 
 Ken Steorts – guitars, guitar synthesizer, backing vocals
 Trey McClurkin – drums, percussion, backing vocals

Additional personnel
 Skidd Mills – drum programming 
 Christopher Reyes – additional loops
 Korey Cooper – additional backing vocals (5)

Production
 Dana Key – executive producer, additional producer (10)
 Patrick Scholes – executive producer
 Skidd Mills – producer, engineer, mixing 
 John Cooper – additional producer, additional arrangements 
 Paul Ebersold – additional producer (10)
 Jason Latshaw – engineer 
 Matt Martone – additional engineer 
 Christopher Reyes – art direction, design, animation 
 Daniel Ball – photography

Music video

A music video was made for the song "More Faithful". It features the band playing in a room with lights all around, with various shots of the sky cut in to show the theme of the song. An example is the line, "You have been more faithful than the morning sun." This is the only video that shows John playing piano, and the last video before his wife Korey joined on keyboards.

Chart performance
The album peaked at No. 25 on the Billboard Christian Albums chart.

References

Skillet (band) albums
ForeFront Records albums
1998 albums